Agrococcus casei is a Gram-positive bacterium from the genus Agrococcus which has been isolated from the surfaces of smear-ripened cheese.

References

Microbacteriaceae
Bacteria described in 2007